Deitz was an unincorporated community in Fayette County, West Virginia.

References 

Unincorporated communities in West Virginia
Unincorporated communities in Fayette County, West Virginia